is a Japanese alpine skier. He competed at the 1992 Winter Olympics in Albertville and at the 1998 Winter Olympics in Nagano.

References

External links
 Official JOC profile 

1971 births
Living people
Japanese male alpine skiers
Olympic alpine skiers of Japan
Alpine skiers at the 1998 Winter Olympics
Alpine skiers at the 1992 Winter Olympics
20th-century Japanese people